The View may refer to:

Television
The View (talk show), an American morning talk show on ABC, broadcast since 1997
The View (Irish TV programme), an Irish television arts programme, broadcast from 1999 to 2011

Music
The View (album), a 1993 album by Chad Wackerman
The View (band), a Scottish indie rock band
"The View" (song), a 2011 song by Lou Reed and Metallica
The View, a 1999 album by Eureka Farm
The View, a 2003 EP by Immaculate Machine
"The View", a 2004 song by Modest Mouse from Good News for People Who Love Bad News
"The View", a 2019 song by Sara Evans and the Barker Family Band from The Barker Family Band
"The View", a 2021 song by Stray Kids from Noeasy

See also
View (disambiguation)